Rear Admiral Abdullah Al Mamun Chowdhury (N), BSP, ndc, psc, BN is a two-star admiral in Bangladesh Navy who is currently serving as Commander, Chattogram Naval Area. Prior to that, he was Assistant Chief of Naval Staff (Logistics). He also served as Director of Submarine, Naval Headquarters, Dhaka. Before that, he served as Chairman of Payra Port Authority until 15 March 2022.

Career 
Chowdhury joined Bangladesh Navy in 1985 and was commissioned in Executive Branch. He served as Bhasanchar project director, The much-talked-about relocation of Rohingya refugees to Bhasanchar Island on the southern tip of Noakhali. During his time, almost 20 thousand Rohingya has been shifted. He oversaw the process of shifting Rohingya people from Kutupalong refugee camp to Island of Noakhali. Before that, Chowdhury was Director of Naval Administrative Authority Dhaka. Admiral Mamun became 1st in merit position in 64th Senior Staff Course at Bangladesh Public Administration Training Centre (BPATC).

References 

Living people
Bangladesh Navy
Bangladesh Navy personnel
Bangladeshi Navy admirals
Year of birth missing (living people)